Rapport is an aspect of unconscious human interaction.

Rapport  may also refer to:

Media
 Rapport (newspaper), one of the largest Sunday newspapers in South Africa 
 Rapport (TV programme), a Swedish news television programme that airs on SVT

People
 Jovana Rapport (born 1992), Serbian women chess Grandmaster
 Richárd Rapport (born 1996), Hungarian chess Grandmaster

Other uses
 Rapport (software), computer security software